Normand G. Dubé (born September 12, 1951) is a Canadian former professional ice hockey player who played 57 games in the National Hockey League and 148 games in the World Hockey Association.  He played with the Kansas City Scouts and Quebec Nordiques. His son Christian Dubé played with his teammates when he was very young.

Career statistics

References

External links

1951 births
Living people
Beauce Jaros players
Canadian ice hockey left wingers
French Quebecers
Sherbrooke Castors players
Sportspeople from Sherbrooke
Springfield Indians players
Kansas City Scouts players
Los Angeles Kings draft picks
Quebec Nordiques (WHA) players
Ice hockey people from Quebec